Ismael Jafet Ortiz Zuñiga (born October 22, 1982 in Panama City) is a swimmer from Panama. He participated in the 2004 Summer Olympics in Athens, competing in the Men's 100-meter Freestyle. His heat time was 51.74 seconds, which was not enough to advance to the semi-finals. Ortiz also represented his native country at the World Championships (long course) in 2001 and 2003.

Despite qualifying to represent Panama in the 2008 Olympics with a time below 23.00 seconds, domestic political circumstances prevented him from competing in the games, causing a small public outcry in his home country.

He swam for the USA's Drury University from 2005-2007. He graduated with a degree in Fine Art in 2008, and currently teaches youth swimming in Miami.

Trivia 

 Ortiz is known affectionately by teammates and fans as "The Ish."
 He is also a successful sculpture artist in his own right, having had many shows in both the United States and in Panama. His found-object artwork is reminiscent of the sculptures of Robert Rauschenberg and Jean Tinguely.
 Ortiz is a noted fan of the manga series Naruto, admittedly spending hours on end watching pirated YouTube transcriptions of the comics. Playful attempts at coining the nickname "Pablo Naruto" (cf. Chilean love poet Pablo Neruda), a pun derived from his characteristic romantic Latin machismo and his aforementioned otaku tendencies, never stuck.

Ortiz is also an avid sailor according to the Denver post.

References

1982 births
Living people
Sportspeople from Panama City
Panamanian male freestyle swimmers
Swimmers at the 2003 Pan American Games
Swimmers at the 2004 Summer Olympics
Drury Panthers men's swimmers
Olympic swimmers of Panama
Pan American Games competitors for Panama